Ute Noack (born 17 January 1943) is a retired German butterfly swimmer who won a gold medal in the 4 × 100 m medley relay at the 1962 European Aquatics Championships, setting a new world record. For this achievement, the relay team members were named German Sportspersonalities of the Year in the team category in 1962. Noack also won the silver medal in the 100 m butterfly at the same championships. She competed at the 1964 Summer Olympics in the 100 m butterfly, but was eliminated in the preliminaries.

References

1943 births
Living people
Swimmers from Berlin
German female swimmers
Swimmers at the 1964 Summer Olympics
Female butterfly swimmers
Olympic swimmers of the United Team of Germany
European Aquatics Championships medalists in swimming